Anneli Heed (née Ahlgren; born August 20, 1978) is a Swedish stand-up comedian, impersonator, and voice actress/dubber currently living in Stockholm.

Filmography

Animation
 Hotel for Dogs (Swedish dub)
 Tess och Ubbe - Skip
 Monsters vs Aliens (Swedish dub)
 Kid vs Kat (Swedish dub) - Coop
 My Little Pony: Pinkie Pie's Ferriswheel Adventures (Swedish dub) - Scootaloo
 Dinosaur Train (Swedish dub) - Dan
 Fish Hooks (Swedish dub) - Bea
 Meningen med Hugo - The parrot
 Cars 2 (Swedish dub) - Mater's computer
 My Little Pony: Friendship is Magic (Swedish dub) - Spike, Sweetie Belle (episode 18 onwards), Cheerilee, Spitfire (episode 26), Photo Finish, Princess Cadance, Queen Chrysalis, singing voice of Rainbow Dash and several background characters.
 Transformers: Prime (Swedish dub) - Arcee
 Kung Fu Panda 2 (Swedish dub) - Tigress
 Littlest Pet Shop (Swedish dub) - The Biskit Twins, Sugar Sprinkles
 Kitty Is Not a Cat (Swedish dub)'' - Miley

External links
 Official website

References

Living people
Swedish voice actresses
1978 births